Botti Boulenin Biabi (born 8 March 1996) is a Scottish professional footballer who plays as a forward for Brechin City.  He has previously played for Falkirk, Swansea City, Hamilton Academical, Macclesfield Town, Ebbsfleet United, Stenhousemuir and Kelty Hearts.

Career

Falkirk
Biabi was born in London, however moved to Scotland aged 12 and grew up in the Scotstoun area of Glasgow, where he attended Knightswood Secondary School and was involved in a training programme for youths in the city's housing estates organised by former Scotland player Andy McLaren. He signed for Falkirk as a 16-year-old from Junior side Clydebank. He made his first team debut in a promotion play-off game against Queen of the South on 6 May 2014. In all he made 32 appearances for Falkirk, in all competitions.

Swansea City
Biabi moved to Premier League club Swansea City on 17 August 2015 for a "six-figure fee", where he joined up with their Under-21 squad.

On 31 August 2017, Biabi signed for Scottish Premiership club Hamilton Academical on a four-month loan.

On 31 January 2019, Biabi signed a one-year extension with Swansea City and joined Macclesfield Town on loan for the remainder of the 2018–19 season.

He was released by the club in July 2019.

International career
Because of parentage and birthplace, Biabi had a three-way choice to make between Ivory Coast, England and Scotland but elected to represent Scotland, the country of his upbringing. He was called up to the Scotland under-19 side for matches in September 2014.

Career statistics

References

1996 births
Living people
Footballers from Camberwell
Association football forwards
Scottish footballers
Scotland youth international footballers
Swansea City A.F.C. players
Falkirk F.C. players
Hamilton Academical F.C. players
Scottish Professional Football League players
Black British sportsmen
English people of Ivorian descent
Scottish people of Ivorian descent
People educated at Knightswood Secondary School
Stenhousemuir F.C. players
Kelty Hearts F.C. players
Sportspeople of Ivorian descent
Clydebank F.C. players